The 1952 Severo-Kurilsk earthquake struck off the coast of the Kamchatka Peninsula. The 9.0 Mw earthquake triggered a major tsunami that hit Severo-Kurilsk, Kuril Islands, Sakhalin Oblast, Russian SFSR, USSR, on 4 November 1952 at 16:58 (UTC). This led to the destruction of many settlements in Sakhalin Oblast and Kamchatka Oblast, while the main impact struck the town of Severo-Kurilsk. It was the fifth most powerful earthquake since 1900, and to date, the most powerful earthquake in Russian history.

Tectonic setting
The earthquake occurred off the Kamchatka Peninsula's east coast, which runs parallel to the Kuril-Kamchatka Trench, the area where the Pacific and Okhotsk Sea plates converge. Being older and therefore denser, the Pacific subducts beneath the Kamchatka Peninsula, which sits on the Okhotsk Sea Plate. These two plates meet along a convergent boundary, marked by the trench. The subduction zone is seismogenic and produces Kamchatka earthquakes, which occasionally generate tsunamis. Earthquakes associated with the Kuril-Kamchatka subduction zone are of the megathrust type. The subduction zone is associated with at least two known ~9.0  earthquakes in the pre-instrumental period; 1737 and 1841. The 1737 earthquake measured  9.0–9.3, and generated the largest known tsunami (60 meters) on the peninsula. Another  9.0 earthquake struck the peninsula on May 17, 1841. It generated a tsunami up to 15 meters high and was felt with a maximum intensity of VIII–IX.

Earthquake
The earthquake ruptured a patch of the subduction zone which extends from the northern portion of Onekotan to Cape Shipunskii; approximately 700 km long. The rupture width is estimated at around 150–200 km. Slip on the rupture patch occurred in a direction perpendicular to the Kuril-Kamchatka Trench.

Two years prior to the mainshock, a sequence of foreshocks commenced near the epicenter location, as well as the southern edge of the rupture. The aftershock sequence one month after the mainshock was used to define the northern extent of slip.

Tsunami 
After the earthquake the majority of the Severo-Kurilsk citizens fled to the surrounding hills, where they escaped the first wave. However, most of them returned to the town and were killed by the second wave. According to the authorities, out of a population of 6,000 people, 2,336 died. The survivors were evacuated to continental Russia. The settlement was then rebuilt in another location.

US property damage
The main economic damage came from the tsunami waves impacting the Hawaiian Islands, where six cows were reported dead, and property damage was between $800,000 and $1,000,000 USD in 1952 dollars. The waves caused a cement barge to fly into a freighter in Honolulu harbor. In Hilo, an expensive boathouse was destroyed. A small portion of the bridge connecting Hilo to nearby Coconut Island was damaged from the strong waves along with houses in the area being stripped from their foundations. Coast guard buoys were torn from their anchors.

See also
List of earthquakes in 1952
List of earthquakes in Russia

References

Sources

External links
  Сливное землетрясение (цунами) 1952 года
 

1952 in the Soviet Union
Sakhalin Oblast
1952 Severo
1952 earthquakes
1952
1952 Severo
November 1952 events in Asia
Kuril Islands
Earthquakes in the Russian Far East
Earthquakes in the Soviet Union